Aurora de la Luz Aguilar Rodríguez (born 15 June 1967) is a Mexican politician affiliated with the PAN. She currently serves as Deputy of the LXII Legislature of the Mexican Congress representing Tlaxcala.

References

1967 births
Living people
People from Tampico, Tamaulipas
Women members of the Chamber of Deputies (Mexico)
National Action Party (Mexico) politicians
21st-century Mexican politicians
21st-century Mexican women politicians
Monterrey Institute of Technology and Higher Education alumni
Politicians from Tamaulipas
Deputies of the LXII Legislature of Mexico
Members of the Chamber of Deputies (Mexico) for Tlaxcala